The Dying of the Light is a 1995 role-playing game adventure for Warhammer Fantasy Roleplay published by Hogshead Publishing.

Contents
The Dying of the Light is an adventure which sets characters on a journey to Marienburg to collect a book for their benefactor's studies, then throws them into the fear surrounding the oncoming eclipse by Morrslieb, the Chaos moon.

Reception
David Comford reviewed The Dying of the Light for Arcane magazine, rating it an 8 out of 10 overall. Butcher comments that "The Dying of the Light is a fine offering from Hogshead Publishing. It might not break any new ground, but this adventure does offer hours of intense roleplaying."

Reviews
Backstab (Issue 2 - Mar/Apr 1997)

References

Role-playing game supplements introduced in 1995
Warhammer Fantasy Roleplay adventures